The District of Diekirch was one of three districts of the Grand Duchy of Luxembourg. Immediately prior to its abolition on 3 October 2015, it contained five cantons divided into 43 communes:

Clervaux
Clervaux
Consthum
Heinerscheid
Hosingen
Munshausen
Troisvierges
Weiswampach
Wincrange
Diekirch
Bettendorf
Bourscheid
Diekirch
Ermsdorf
Erpeldange
Ettelbruck
Feulen
Hoscheid
Medernach
Mertzig
Reisdorf
Schieren
Redange
Beckerich
Ell
Grosbous
Préizerdaul
Rambrouch
Redange
Saeul
Useldange
Vichten
Wahl
Vianden
Putscheid
Tandel
Vianden
Wiltz
Boulaide
Esch-sur-Sûre
Eschweiler
Goesdorf
Heiderscheid
Kiischpelt
Lac de la Haute-Sûre
Neunhausen
Wiltz
Winseler

To its west, the district of Diekirch bordered the Belgian province of Luxembourg in the region of Wallonia, whilst to its north was the Belgian providence of Liège. To its south could be found the district of Luxembourg with the district of Grevenmacher to its south-east. Finally, the German State of Rhineland-Palatinate bordered the east of the district of Diekirch. It had a per capita income of $49,000.

External links

http://www.diekirch.lu/ Official website (French/German)
http://www.virtualtourist.com/vt/25c/ Info on Diekirch
http://www.communes.lu/ Features a map of the communes of Luxembourg

 
Districts of Luxembourg